Chiwan (Cantonese: Chik Wan) is a bay area surrounded by Chiwan hill at the east, Xiaonanshan hill at the north, and Ying Zui hill at the southeast, in Nanshan district, Shenzhen, China.

Chiwan Port
Chiwan Port or  Chiwan Container Terminal is part of the Port of Shenzhen. CCT is a sino-foreign joint venture company invested by Chiwan Wharf Holdings Limited, Kerry Properties (HK) Limited, China Merchants Holdings (International) Co., Ltd and Modern Terminal Limited (Modern Terminals). The port of Chiwan is used by ships for crew changes, especially container ships, bulk carriers, OSVs - offshore supply and support vessels and off shore craft involved in the exploration of oil in the South China Sea.

Places of historic interest
 Chiwan Left Fort is located on Yingzui Hill, Chiwan. It was constructed in 1717 and was among the forts used by Lin Zexu during the First Opium War
 Chiwan Tianhou Temple dates back to the Song Dynasty. It was said to be built as an offering to Mazu for protecting the fleet of Zheng He. It was rebuilt over the following centuries and the present structure was constructed in the early 1990s. It is the largest temple complex dedicated to Tianhou in Guangdong.
 Song Shaodi's Tomb is the tomb of the last Song Dynasty Emperor, the 7-year-old Emperor Bing.
Chiwan Beacon, built in 1394 at the peak of Xiaonanshan hill, was used in the following centuries as a military facility to issue alerts for potential military attacks.

Education
There is a combined elementary and junior high school, Shenzhen Nanshan Chiwan School (深圳市南山区赤湾学校).

A K-12 boarding school called Broadstone Academy Shenzhen will open in 2022. It will have a bilingual curriculum.

See also
 Shekou, a residential and formerly industrial area east of Chiwan
 Chiwan Station, the Shenzhen Metro station serving the area

References

External links

Website of Chiwan Container Terminal Co. Ltd.

Ports and harbours of China
Transport in Shenzhen